National Route 118 is a national highway of Japan connecting Mito, Ibaraki and Aizuwakamatsu, Fukushima in Japan, with a total length of 206.1 km (128.06 mi).

See also

References

External links

118
Roads in Fukushima Prefecture
Roads in Ibaraki Prefecture